Oleg Nikiforenko (born 17 March 2001) is a Belarusian professional footballer who plays for Dinamo Minsk.

Honors
Dinamo Brest
Belarusian Premier League champion: 2019
Belarusian Super Cup winner: 2019

References

External links 
 
 

2001 births
Living people
People from Mogilev
Sportspeople from Mogilev Region
Belarusian footballers
Association football midfielders
FC Dnepr Mogilev players
FC Dynamo Brest players
FC Rukh Brest players
FC Isloch Minsk Raion players
FC Dinamo Minsk players